The Mouth of the Aguapeí Private Natural Heritage Reserve is a private natural heritage reserve in the state of São Paulo, Brazil. It protects an area of marshland known as the "Pantanal of São Paulo" where the Aguapeí River enters the Paraná River.

Location

The Mouth of the Aguapeí Private Natural Heritage Reserve (RPPN) is divided between the municipalities of Castilho, São João do Pau d'Alho and Pauliceia in the state of São Paulo.
It is located at the mouth of the Aguapeí River on the Paraná River, and the Ilha Comprida.
It forms a continuous protected area with the Aguapeí State Park, which is part of the environmental compensation for the Eng Sérgio Motta Dam.

The reserve protects one of the last naturally flooded areas of the state, home to marsh deer and other species typical of this environment.
It should reduce sand and clay mining, and strengthen enforcement against hunting the deer for sale of antlers or stuffed heads.
The reserve supports environmental education and research.

Environment

The reserve is covered by secondary growth of seasonal semi-deciduous forest, arboreal/shrub/herbaceous formations in the várzea areas, and areas of riparian palms.
Vegetation includes the vulnerable Euterpe edulis (Jussara palmito).
Vulnerable, threatened or endangered fauna include horned screamer (Anhima cornuta), wood stork (Mycteria americana), black-collared hawk (Busarellus nigricollis), jabiru (Jabiru mycteria), American pygmy kingfisher (Chloroceryle aenea), toco toucan (Ramphastos toco), blue-and-yellow macaw (Ara ararauna) and South American tapir (Tapirus terrestris).

The "Pantanal Paulista Wildlife Refuge", as it was called in earlier discussions, would be part of the proposed Trinational Biodiversity Corridor, which aims to provide forest connections between conservation units in Brazil, Paraguay and Argentina in the Upper Paraná ecoregion.

History

On 16 April 2003 the State Council for the Environment of São Paulo (Consema) approved the environmental compensation agreement for the Três Irmãos Hydroelectric Plant of the Companhia Energética de São Paulo (CESP).
The mouth of the Aguapeí River was to be made a  wildlife refuge.
The RPPN was created by resolution 117 of 19 December 2010.
CESP was required to provide a total of  including the buffer zone of the reserve.

Notes

Sources

Private natural heritage reserves of Brazil
Protected areas of São Paulo (state)
2010 establishments in Brazil
Protected areas of the Atlantic Forest